Ashford Bowdler is a civil parish in Shropshire, England.  It contains 22 listed buildings that are recorded in the National Heritage List for England.  Of these, two are listed at Grade II*, the middle grade of the three grades, and the others are at Grade II, the lowest grade.  The parish contains the village of Ashford Bowdler and the surrounding countryside.  Most of the listed buildings are in the village, and consist of a church and items in the churchyard, houses, cottages, farmhouses, and farm buildings.  Outside the village, the most important building is a country house, Ashford Hall; the hall and some associated structures are listed.  The other listed buildings are a road bridge, a milepost, and a railway bridge.


Key

Buildings

References

Citations

Sources

Lists of buildings and structures in Shropshire